One Day (有一天) is a 2010 Taiwanese film directed by Hou Chi-jan.

Cast
Bryan Chang as Tsung 
Nikki Hsieh as Singing 
Gwen Yao as Mum

Awards and nominations

References

External links

Magic realism films
2010 romance films
2010 films
Taiwanese romance films
2010 directorial debut films